Okuka is a Serbian surname. It's also a Luo (Acholi) surname.
It may refer to:
Dragan Okuka (born 1954), Serbian football manager and a former player
Miloš Okuka (born 1944), Serbian linguist and professor

Serbian surnames